There are several lists of wheelchair tennis champions:

List of men's wheelchair tennis champions
List of women's wheelchair tennis champions
List of quad wheelchair tennis champions

Wheelchair tennis at the Summer Paralympics#Medalists